The Taking of Christ is a painting, of the arrest of Jesus, by the Italian Baroque master Michelangelo Merisi da Caravaggio. Originally commissioned by the Roman nobleman Ciriaco Mattei in 1602, it is housed in the National Gallery of Ireland, Dublin.

Description
There are seven figures in the painting: from left to right they are John, Jesus, Judas, three soldiers (the one farthest to the right barely visible in the rear), and a man holding a lantern to the scene. They are standing, and only the upper three-quarters of their bodies are depicted. Judas has just kissed Jesus to identify him for the soldiers. The figures are arrayed before a very dark background, in which the setting is obscured. The main light source is not evident in the painting but comes from the upper left; the lesser light source is the lantern held by the man at the right (believed to be a self-portrait of Caravaggio; also, presumably, representing St Peter, who would first betray Jesus by denying him, and then go on to bring the light of Christ to the world). At the far left, a man (St John) is fleeing; his arms are raised, his mouth is open in a gasp, his cloak is flying and being snatched back by a soldier. The flight of the terrified John contrasts with the entrance of the artist; scholars claim that Caravaggio is making the point that even a sinner one thousand years after the resurrection has a better understanding of Christ than does his friend.

Two of the more puzzling details of the painting are, one, the fact that the heads of Jesus and St. John seem to visually meld together in the upper left corner, and, two, the fact of the prominent presence, in the very centre of the canvas and in the foremost plane of the picture, of the arresting officer's highly polished, metal-clad arm. Regarding the detail of the polished metal pauldron of the soldier in the centre of the picture, Franco Mormando suggests that it was meant by the artist to serve as a mirror, a mirror of self-reflection and examination of conscience (such as in Caravaggio's Martha and Mary Magdalene in Detroit): as do many spiritual writers and preachers of the period, the artist may be 'inviting his viewers to see themselves reflected in the behaviour of Judas' through their own daily acts of betrayal of Jesus, that is, through their sin.

Sources
The central group, composed of Jesus, Judas and the soldier with an outstretched hand, resembles a 1509 woodcut by Albrecht Dürer from his Small Passion series.

Loss and rediscovery
By the late 18th century, the painting was thought to have disappeared, and its whereabouts remained unknown for about 200 years. In 1990, Caravaggio's lost masterpiece was recognized in the residence of the Society of Jesus in Dublin, Ireland. The rediscovery was published in November 1993.

The painting had been hanging in the Dublin Jesuits’ dining room since the early 1930s but had long been considered a copy of the lost original by Gerard van Honthorst, also known as Gherardo delle Notti, one of Caravaggio's Dutch followers. This erroneous attribution had already been made while the painting was in the possession of the Roman Mattei family, whose ancestor had originally commissioned it. In 1786, one Giuseppe Vasi misattributed the painting, recording it as a work by Honthorst, and this error had been repeated in an inventory of the Mattei family's possessions taken in 1793. In 1802, the Mattei sold it, as a work by Honthorst, to William Hamilton Nisbet, in whose home in Scotland it hung until 1921. Later in that decade, still unrecognised for what it was, the painting was sold to an Irish paediatrician, Marie Lea-Wilson, who eventually donated it in the 1930s to the Jesuit Fathers in Dublin, in gratitude for their support following the shooting of her husband, Capt. Percival Lea-Wilson, a District Inspector in the Royal Irish Constabulary in Gorey, County Wexford, by the Irish Republican Army on 15 June 1920.

The Taking of Christ remained in the Dublin Jesuits' possession for about 60 years, until it was spotted and recognised, in the early 1990s, by Sergio Benedetti, Senior Conservator of the National Gallery of Ireland, who had been asked by Father Noel Barber, S.J., to examine a number of paintings in the Leeson Street Jesuit Community (of which Barber was superior) for the purposes of restoration. As layers of dirt and discoloured varnish were removed, the high technical quality of the painting was revealed, and it was tentatively identified as Caravaggio's lost painting. Much of the credit for verifying the authenticity of this painting belongs to Francesca Cappelletti and Laura Testa, two graduate students at the University of Rome. During a long period of research, they found the first recorded mention of The Taking of Christ, in an ancient and decaying account book documenting the original commission and payments to Caravaggio, in the archives of the Mattei family, kept in the cellar of a palazzo in the small town of Recanati.

The painting is on indefinite loan to the National Gallery of Ireland from the Jesuit Community, Leeson Street, Dublin, who acknowledge the kind generosity of Dr Marie Lea-Wilson. It was displayed in the United States as the centrepiece of a 1999 exhibition entitled "Saints and Sinners," organized by Franco Mormando at the McMullen Museum of Art, at Boston College, and at the 2006 "Rembrandt / Caravaggio" exhibition in the van Gogh Museum, Amsterdam. In 2010 it was displayed from February to June at the Scuderie del Quirinale, Rome, for the 400th anniversary of Caravaggio's death. In 2016 it was displayed in the National Gallery, London.

Copies
There are at least 12 known copies of this painting. These include ones in the Metropolitan Cathedral of Sucre Museum in Bolivia and St Bede's College, Manchester, and one formerly in the Walter P. Chrysler Jr. Collection.

The Odessa Museum of Western and Eastern Art (Ukraine) has a copy of The Taking of Christ believed to be an original copy made by Caravaggio himself. The painting was stolen from the museum in 2008 and found in Germany.  After restoration and research Ukrainian and Russian scientists claimed it is a copy, made by Giovanni di Attili for Asdrubale Mattei, brother of the original's owner – Ciriaco Mattei. The account books of Asdrubale record a payment of 12 scudi in 1626 for this work.

Sannini version: putative original
A version owned by the Sannini family of Florence came to the attention of Roberto Longhi in 1943, who considered it a copy. In 2003, dealer Mario Bigetti, suspecting it was an original, contracted to buy it. He consulted Maria Letizia Paoletti, who argued the large number of pentimenti visible under X-ray images proved the painting was the original. Sir Denis Mahon, who had in 1993 authenticated the Dublin version, in 2004 stated that the Sannini version was Caravaggio's original, but that the Dublin version was a copy by Caravaggio himself. This prompted comment in the Irish and British media in February 2004. The Sannini version was the subject of a legal dispute and was taken into official custody, where pigment analysis by Maurizio Seracini found Naples yellow, which was not known in painting before 1615.  Seracini said this proved it was not the original; Paoletti disagreed. Jonathan Harr's book about the Dublin painting accepts Seracini's argument, while Michael Daley of ArtWatch was not convinced.

Cultural references
 A nod was made to the finding of The Taking of Christ by Caravaggio in the film Ordinary Decent Criminal starring Kevin Spacey.
 The Hands of Caravaggio, an album from 2001 by electro-acoustic improvisation group M.I.M.E.O. was inspired by the painting.
 The painting was the subject of a special Easter program in 2009 in the BBC series The Private Life of a Masterpiece.
Mel Gibson said that the cinematography in The Passion of the Christ aimed to imitate Caravaggio's style.  The arrest scene in the film uses similar perspective, lighting, and placement of figures as the painting at the moment the soldiers seize Jesus.
The painting was used as a candidate for an RTÉ competition looking for 'Ireland's Favourite Painting'.

See also
List of paintings by Caravaggio

Footnotes

References

Sources
 
 
 
 
 Müller, Jürgen. "Der Judaskuss der Malerei: Caravaggios Dubliner Gefangennahme Christi in neuer Deutung" Zeitschrift für Kunstgeschichte 85, no. 1 (2022): 57-81.

Citations

External links
 The Lost Painting: A Caravaggio Found  American Society of Cinematographers

1602 paintings
Paintings by Caravaggio
Caravaggio
Collection of the National Gallery of Ireland